Grand Prince Uiseong was a Korean Royal Prince as the only son of Taejo of Goryeo and Lady Uiseong who married his half-sister and had no any issue.

References

Grand Prince Uiseongbuwon on Encykorea .

Korean princes
Year of birth unknown
Year of death unknown
10th-century Korean people